Jászkisér is a town in Jász-Nagykun-Szolnok county, in the Northern Great Plain region of central Hungary.

Geography

Population

International relations
Jászkisér is twinned with:

 Niederlenz, Switzerland
 Stara Moravica (Bácskossuthfalva), Serbia 
 Szczyrk, Poland

References

External links

  in Hungarian

Populated places in Jász-Nagykun-Szolnok County
Jászság